Sobienie Szlacheckie  is a village in Otwock County, Gmina Sobienie-Jeziory.The  population is near 300. In the village is Voivodship Road 739. From 1975 to 1998 village was in Siedlce Voivodeship.

The "Szlacheckie" is historical suffix, which means belonging to szlachta, like Sobienie belonging to szlachta, not e.g. bishops. (szlachta is Polish nobility, however in  medieval Poland, szlachta was very large group, including also the stereotypical man with only the sword attached on rope, because he had no money to buy a proper case).

Airport 
There is an airport with ICAO code EPSJ in the village. It can host planes up to 5700 kg, including also ultra light.

Villages in Otwock County